A357 may refer to:

 A357 road (Great Britain), a main road in Great Britain
 RFA Surf Patrol (A357), a British fleet auxiliary vessel